Habrona is a genus of moths belonging to the subfamily Thyatirinae of the Drepanidae.

Species
Habrona alboplagata Bethune-Baker, 1908
Habrona brunnea Bethune-Baker, 1908
Habrona caerulescens Warren, 1915
Habrona concinna Warren, 1915
Habrona marmorata Warren, 1915
Habrona papuata (Warren, 1915)

References

 , 1908, Novitates zoologicae 15: 179
 , 2007, Esperiana Buchreihe zur Entomologie Band 13: 1-683 

Thyatirinae
Drepanidae genera